Pine Hall, also known as Anderson-Hanes House, is a historic plantation house located at Pine Hall, Stokes County, North Carolina. It was built in 1859, and is a two-story, three bay by two bay, Greek Revival style brick dwelling.  The front facade features a one-story portico with a hip roof and
paired heavy Doric order pillars.  Also on the property are a number of contributing outbuildings and a family cemetery.

It was listed on the National Register of Historic Places in 1979.

References

Plantation houses in North Carolina
Houses on the National Register of Historic Places in North Carolina
Greek Revival houses in North Carolina
Houses completed in 1859
Houses in Stokes County, North Carolina
National Register of Historic Places in Stokes County, North Carolina